Hexoplon bucki is a species of beetle in the family Cerambycidae. It was described by Martins in 1967.

References

Hexoplonini
Beetles described in 1967